Angela Malone (born in 1971) is the author of Lucia's Measure, the story of a giantess.  It was shortlisted for the 2001 Christina Stead Fiction Prize, NSW Premier's Award.  In 2008 she was awarded the Gwen Harwood Poetry Prize.

Education 
Angela Malone studied for her undergraduate degree at the University of Technology, Sydney. She completed a master's degree in English at the University of Melbourne.

References

Living people
Australian poets
Australian women novelists
University of Technology Sydney alumni
University of Melbourne alumni
1971 births